Ty Ty is a city in Tift County, Georgia, United States. The population was 725 at the 2010 census.  The community takes its name from nearby Ty Ty Creek.

Geography

Ty Ty is located at  (31.471106, -83.648859).

Demographics

2020 census

As of the 2020 United States census, there were 641 people, 260 households, and 202 families residing in the city.

2010 census
As of the 2010 United States Census, there were 725 people living in the city. The racial makeup of the city was 57.0% White, 34.8% Black, 1.0% Asian, 0.1% from some other race and 1.1% from two or more races. 6.1% were Hispanic or Latino of any race.

2000 census
As of the census of 2000, there were 716 people, 265 households, and 193 families living in the city. The racial makeup of the city was 63.41% White, 32.82% African American, 0.14% Asian, 2.93% from other races, and 0.70% from two or more races. Hispanic or Latino of any race were 3.63% of the population.

There were 265 households, out of which 37.0% had children under the age of 18 living with them, 50.2% were married couples living together, 17.7% had a female householder with no husband present, and 26.8% were non-families. 21.1% of all households were made up of individuals, and 10.2% had someone living alone who was 65 years of age or older. The average household size was 2.70 and the average family size was 3.11.

In the city, the population was spread out, with 27.5% under the age of 18, 10.8% from 18 to 24, 30.9% from 25 to 44, 18.4% from 45 to 64, and 12.4% who were 65 years of age or older. The median age was 33 years. For every 100 females, there were 89.9 males. For every 100 females age 18 and over, there were 82.7 males.

The median income for a household in the city was $27,721, and the median income for a family was $30,750. Males had a median income of $23,095 versus $19,821 for females. The per capita income for the city was $16,608. About 13.2% of families and 16.7% of the population were below the poverty line, including 17.5% of those under age 18 and 24.5% of those age 65 or over.

Notable people
Ty Ty is the birthplace and home of Darby Cottle Veazey, a two-time All-American softball player and one of only two female athletes to have their number retired at Florida State University.  Cottle was named the USOC "Best Amateur Softball Player" in the nation in 1981 and later won the prestigious Broderick Award.

Ty Ty is also the hometown of bass singer James “Big Chief” Wetherington, who sang with many Gospel Music quartets, most notably, The Statesmen.

References

External links 

Cities in Georgia (U.S. state)
Cities in Tift County, Georgia